Cerbalus is a genus of huntsman spiders that was first described by Eugène Louis Simon in 1897. It is considered a senior synonym of Marmarica.

Species
 it contains eight species, found in Africa, Israel, Jordan, and on the Canary Islands:
Cerbalus alegranzaensis Wunderlich, 1992 – Canary Is.
Cerbalus aravaensis Levy, 2007 – Israel, Jordan
Cerbalus ergensis Jäger, 2000 – Tunisia
Cerbalus negebensis Levy, 1989 – Israel
Cerbalus pellitus Kritscher, 1960 – Egypt
Cerbalus psammodes Levy, 1989 – Egypt, Israel
Cerbalus pulcherrimus (Simon, 1880) (type) – North Africa
Cerbalus verneaui (Simon, 1889) – Canary Is.

See also
 List of Sparassidae species

References

Araneomorphae genera
Sparassidae
Spiders of Africa
Spiders of Asia